Antrim Upper is a barony in County Antrim, Northern Ireland. It is bordered by six other baronies: Antrim Lower to the north; Toome Upper to the west; Massereene Lower to the south-west; Belfast Upper to the south; Belfast Lower to the south-east; and Glenarm Upper to the east.

List of settlements
Below is a list of settlements in Antrim Upper:

Towns
Antrim (split with barony of Toome Upper)
Ballyclare (split with barony of Belfast Lower)

Villages
Doagh
Dunadry
Parkgate

List of civil parishes
Below is a list of civil parishes in Antrim Upper:
Antrim (split with barony of Toome Upper)
Ballycor
Doagh Grange
Donegore
Kilbride
Grange of Nilteen
Rashee

References

 
Clandeboye